The 2014 Energiewacht Tour is a stage race held in the Netherlands, with a UCI rating of 2.2, from 9 April to 13 April.

Ellen van Dijk won the tour in 2013.

Stages

Stage 1
9 April 2014 – Delfzijl to Delfzijl,

Stage 2
10 April  2014 – Westerwolde to Westerwolde,

Stage 3a
11 April  2014 – Tynaarlo to Tynaarlo,

Stage 3b
11 April  2014 – Oldambt, team time trial (TTT)

Stage 4
12 April  2014 – Eemsmond to Eemsmond,

Stage 5
13 April  2014 – Veendam to Veendam,

Classification leadership table
 denotes the rider with the lowest accumulated time and is the overall race leader
 denotes the leader of the Points classification
 denotes the leader of the Sprint classification
 denotes the leader of the Combativity classification
 denotes rider with the lowest accumulated time, who is under a specified age and leader of the Youth classification
 denotes the leader of the Club classification, which consists of the rider with the best overall time from a non-UCI Women's team

References

See also
2014 in women's road cycling

Energiewacht Tour
Energiewacht Tour
Healthy Ageing Tour